Ernest Saint-Charles Cosson (22 July 1819 – 31 December 1889) was a French botanist born in Paris.

Cosson is known for his botanical research in North Africa, and during his career he participated in eight trips to Algeria. In several of these he was accompanied by Henri-René Le Tourneux de la Perraudière (1831-1861),  whom he honoured in the naming of several species and genera (e.g., Perralderia, Galium perralderii). In 1863 he was elected president of the Société botanique de France, and from 1873 to 1889, he was a member of the Académie des sciences.

In 1882 Jules Ferry, as Minister of Public Instruction, decided to create a mission to explore the Regency of Tunisia.
The expedition was headed by Cosson and included the botanist Napoléon Doumet-Adanson and other naturalists.
In 1884 a geological section under Georges Rolland was added to the Tunisian Scientific Exploration Mission.
Rolland was assisted by Philippe Thomas from 1885 and by Georges Le Mesle in 1887.

With Jacques Nicolas Ernest Germain de Saint-Pierre (1815–1882), Cosson published the influential Atlas de la Flore des Environs de Paris.

Botanical specimens collected by Cosson are held in many herbaria around the world, including the National Museum of Natural History, France, Harvard University Herbaria, the herbarium at the Royal Botanic Gardens, Kew, the National Herbarium of Victoria at the Royal Botanic Gardens Victoria, Copenhagen University Botanical Museum, the New York Botanical Garden, and the Komarov Botanical Institute, among others.

Selected writings 
 
 Introduction à la Flore d'Algérie, etc. (with Michel Charles Durieu de Maisonneuve), 1854.
 Rapport sur un Voyage botanique en Algérie, de Philippeville a` Biskra et dans les Monts Aure's, 1856.
 Instructions sur les observations et les collections botaniques à faire dans les voyages, 1872
 Note sur le projet de création en Algérie d'une mer dite intérieure, 1880
 Forets, bois et broussailles des principales localités du Nord de la Tunisie explores, 1883.
 Compendium florae Atlanticae [...] Volume I. Première partie.- Historique et Géographie..., 1881 
 Compendium florae Atlanticae [...] Volume II. Supplément à la partie historique et flore des états barbaresques..., 1887 
 Illustrationes florae Atlanticae [...] Volumen I..., 1882-1890  
 Illustrationes florae Atlanticae [...] Volumen II..., 1892-1897  
 Instructions sur les observations et les collections botaniques à faire dans les voyages..., 1872  
 Note sur la flore del la Kroumirie centrale..., 1885   
 Notes sur quelques plantes critiques, rares ou nouvelles..., 1849-1852 
 Cosson, Ernest Saint-Charles & Germain de Saint-Pierre, Jacques-Nicolas-Ernest
  Atlas de la flore des environs de Paris [...] Deuxième édition..., 1882  
  Flore descriptive et analytique des environs de Paris..., 1845  
  Flore [descriptive et analytique] des environs de Paris [...] Deuxième édition..., 1861  
  Observations sur quelques plantes critiques des environs de Paris..., 1840  
  Supplément au Catalogue raisonné des plantes vasculaires des environs Paris..., 1843  
  Synopsis analytique de la flore des environs de Paris [...] Deuxième édition..., 1859  
  Synopsis analytique de la flore des environs de Paris [...] Troisième édition..., 1876 	
 Cosson, Ernest Saint-Charles ; Germain de Saint-Pierre, Jacques-Nicolas-Ernest & Weddell, Hugh Algernon
 Introduction à une flore analytique et descriptive des environs de Paris..., 1842

References

Sources 

19th-century French botanists
1819 births
1889 deaths
Botanists active in Africa
Members of the French Academy of Sciences
Scientists from Paris
Taxon authorities of Hypericum species